The women's heptathlon competition at the 2004 Summer Olympics in Athens was held at the Olympic Stadium on 20–21 August.

Competition format
The heptathlon consists of seven track and field events, with a points system that awards higher scores for better results in each of the seven components. The seven event scores are summed to give a total for the heptathlon.

Schedule
All times are Greece Standard Time (UTC+2)

Records
, the existing World and Olympic records were as follows.

No new records were set during the competition.

Overall results 
The final results of the event are in the following table.

Key

References

External links
Official Olympic Report

Heptathlon
2004
2004 in women's athletics
Women's events at the 2004 Summer Olympics